The Vardar Statistical Region is one of eight statistical regions of North Macedonia. Vardar, located in the central part of North Macedonia, borders Greece to the south. Internally, it borders the Pelagonia, Southwestern, Skopje, Southeastern, and Eastern. The Vardar Statistical Region is named after the Vardar River, which runs through the region.

Municipalities

Vardar statistical region is divided into 9 municipalities:
Čaška
Demir Kapija
Gradsko
Kavadarci
Lozovo
Negotino
Rosoman
Sveti Nikole
Veles

Geography
The Vardar Statistical Region is bisected by the Vardar River and is bounded to the south by Greece. The region is flatter than most of the rest of the country.

Demographics

Population
The current population of the Vardar Statistical Region is 154,535 citizens, according to the last population census in 2002, making it the least populous of the eight statistical regions.

Ethnicities
The largest ethnic group in the region is the Macedonians.

See also

Vardar

References

Statistical regions of North Macedonia